Brentford was a constituency named after the town of Brentford in Middlesex and was drawn to take in Hounslow, Norwood Green and Twickenham.  It returned one Member of Parliament (MP) to the House of Commons of the UK Parliament. The constituency was created for the 1885 general election and abolished for that of 1918.

Boundaries
The local government district of Brentford, the civil parishes of Heston, Isleworth, Norwood (also known as Norwood Green), and Twickenham, and part of the civil parish of Hanwell.

Context
The constituency was in the south-west of Middlesex, in present outer-southwest London. It was one of seven divisions of a soon-to-be County of London). It was named after its medieval market town of Brentford, on the north (Middlesex) bank of the River Thames. The seat bordered the Ealing division to the north and north-east, Kingston to the south-east and Uxbridge from the north-west to south-west.

Brentford had been the husting place for the two-member county of Middlesex since 1700, 155 years after the formation of the second breakaway urban division of Middlesex, the two-member seat of Westminster. The county as a whole saw 47 members replacing 18 before 1885, the greatest absolute rise of any county at a national boundary review.

Successors
Both of the seat's successors took in parts of an adjoining Middlesex division (seat).

Present administrative tiers
In 1965 the area of this old division became parts of the London Boroughs of Hounslow, Richmond upon Thames and Ealing.

Members of Parliament

Elections

Elections in the 1880s 

Coope's death caused a by-election.

Elections in the 1890s

Elections in the 1900s

Elections in the 1910s 

General Election 1914–15:

Another General Election was required to take place before the end of 1915. The political parties had been making preparations for an election to take place and by the July 1914, the following candidates had been selected; 
Unionist: William Joynson-Hicks
Liberal: William George Lobjoit

References

 Boundaries of Parliamentary Constituencies 1885-1972, compiled and edited by F.W.S. Craig (Parliamentary Reference Publications 1972)
 British Parliamentary Election Results 1885-1918, compiled and edited by F.W.S. Craig (The Macmillan Press 1974)

History of the London Borough of Hounslow
Parliamentary constituencies in London (historic)
Constituencies of the Parliament of the United Kingdom established in 1885
Constituencies of the Parliament of the United Kingdom disestablished in 1918
Politics of the London Borough of Hounslow